DVM may refer to:

 Dalvik virtual machine, formerly used in the Android operating system
 Diel vertical migration, a pattern of movement used by some organisms
 Digital voltmeter, a type of voltmeter used for measuring electrical potential difference
 Doctor of Veterinary Medicine, a degree received by veterinary physicians as part of their education